Jason Victorino Jozef Wall (born 10 December 1991) is a Curaçao international footballer who plays for Dutch club RKTVV Tilburg, as a right back.

Career
Born in Willemstad, Wall has played club football for RKTVV Tilburg and Willem II.

He made his international debut for Curaçao in 2014.

References

1991 births
Living people
People from Willemstad
Curaçao footballers
Association football fullbacks
Willem II (football club) players
Curaçao international footballers
2014 Caribbean Cup players